Portmeirion is a British pottery company based in Stoke-on-Trent, England. They specialise in earthenware tableware.

History
Portmeirion Pottery began in 1960 when pottery designer Susan Williams-Ellis (daughter of Sir Clough Williams-Ellis, who created the Italian-style Portmeirion Village in North Wales) and her husband, Euan Cooper-Willis, took over a small pottery-decorating company in Stoke-on-Trent called A. E. Gray Ltd, also known as Gray's Pottery. Susan Williams-Ellis had been working with A.E. Gray for some years, commissioning designs to sell at the gift shop in Portmeirion Village, the items bearing the backstamp "Gray's Pottery Portmeirionware". In 1961, the couple purchased a second pottery company, Kirkhams Ltd, that had the capacity to manufacture pottery, and not only decorate it. These two businesses were combined and Portmeirion Potteries Ltd was born.

Susan Williams-Ellis' early Portmeirion designs included Malachite (1960), Moss Agate (1961) and Talisman (1962). In 1963, she created the popular design Totem, an abstract pattern based on primitive forms coupled with a cylindrical shape.

She later created Magic City (1966) and Magic Garden (1970), but arguably Portmeirion's most recognised design is the Botanic Garden range, decorated with a variety of floral illustrations adapted from Thomas Green's Universal or-Botanical, Medical and Agricultural Dictionary (1817), and looking back to a tradition begun by the Chelsea porcelain factory's "botanical" designs of the 1750s. It was launched in 1972 and, with new designs added periodically, is still made today, the most successful ceramics series of botanical subjects. More recent designs have included Sophie Conran's Crazy Daisy and Dawn Chorus.

On 23 April 2009, Portmeirion Potteries Ltd purchased the Royal Worcester and Spode brands, after they had been placed into administration the previous November. Portmeirion Potteries has since changed its company name to Portmeirion Group to reflect this acquisition. The purchase did not include the manufacturing facilities of Royal Worcester or Spode. The manufacture of much of Spode's ware was returned to Britain from the Far East, to the Portmeirion Group's factory in Stoke-on-Trent.

In 2019, the Victoria and Albert Museum mounted an exhibition of Portmeirion pottery.

Gallery

References

Further reading
 Jenkins, Stephen, & Mckay, Stephen 2000. Portmeirion Pottery. Richard Dennis. .

External links
 Official website
 Resource website for Grays Pottery
 Portmeirion Pottery Collectors' Website (archive only)

Ceramics manufacturers of England
Welsh pottery
Staffordshire pottery
Companies based in Stoke-on-Trent
Design companies established in 1960
British companies established in 1960
Manufacturing companies established in 1960
1960 establishments in England
Privately held companies of the United Kingdom